Christian Alder (born 3 September 1978) is a German former professional footballer who played as a defender.

Career 
Alder was born in Wittmund,  Lower Saxony. Between 1997 and 2000 he played for Arminia Bielefeld through their relegation and promotion in and out of the Bundesliga. He then played for VfL Osnabrück (in 2001) and FC Augsburg (between 2002 and 2004). From 2004 to 2006 he played for SSV Jahn Regensburg; in 2006 he joined VfR Aalen and left the team in June 2009, to sign on 22 July 2009 with Anorthosis Famagusta. After the firing of Ernst Middendorp Alder was released on 13 August 2009. Alder left Cyprus in January 2010 and signed for German lower League club KFC Uerdingen 05.

References

External links
 

1978 births
Living people
People from Wittmund
German footballers
TuS Celle FC players
Arminia Bielefeld players
VfL Osnabrück players
FC Augsburg players
SSV Jahn Regensburg players
VfR Aalen players
Rot Weiss Ahlen players
TuS Haltern players
Bundesliga players
2. Bundesliga players
3. Liga players
Association football defenders
Footballers from Lower Saxony
21st-century German people